Captain Strong is a fictional character appearing in American comic books published by DC Comics. He was created as a parody of Popeye.

Publishing history
First appearing in Action Comics #421 (February 1973), Captain Horatio Strong was created by writer Cary Bates, who had wanted to see what would happen if Superman and Popeye (or a reasonable proxy of him) were to meet. In the first story, Bates presented a darker side of the famous sailor; the green vegetable that gave him his strength was a drug, making him dangerously irrational as well as superhumanly powerful.

The character was designed to be more realistic-looking than Popeye, but still similar to him in appearance and speech. Other characters who appeared in his stories included Carnox (the DC Comics version of Bluto), his girlfriend Olivia Tallow (a takeoff of Olive Oyl), whom he later married, and his idle rich friend J. Wellington Jones (a knockoff of J. Wellington Wimpy). In one story Strong was reunited with his long-lost father, Pappy Strong (a takeoff of Poopdeck Pappy).

Captain Strong appeared in five stories from 1973 to 1985, and reappeared in The New 52 volume of Harley Quinn's solo title.

Fictional biography
Horatio Strong, captain of The Fantasia, is naturally stronger than most men, but one day he discovered a strange seaweed he called "sauncha", the consumption of which made him superhumanly strong. At first he used his newfound power to do good for others, but the sauncha (which turned out to be of extraterrestrial origin) had unexpected side effects; it acted like a drug, making its user dangerously irrational and causing severe withdrawal pains. After being stopped by Superman and taken to a hospital, Strong swore off ever using sauncha again, saying that he would only rely on normal vegetables to keep up his strength. Strong became a friend of both Clark Kent and Superman (never realizing that they were the same man, of course).

The New 52
In The New 52, Captain Strong is reintroduced as trying to untangle his boat from some strangely glowing seaweed. He eats some of the seaweed, which has some strange effect on him, making him glow like the seaweed. Later on, his wife reports him missing and hires Harley Quinn's newly formed Gang of Harleys to find him. Two members of the gang go out to investigate. They find him in the toilets of a bar, but the seaweed gave him super-strength and drove him mad, so he knocks them down. Harley and the other members of her gang go after him. Harley eats his seaweed and begins to hallucinate. While she is taken to a hospital, Strong takes the rest of the gang to his boat. There, his mind clears for a moment, but the seaweed caused addiction and he eats more of it, becoming irrational again. Harley rushes to save her gang, but Strong defeats her. Captain Strong is only stopped by the arrival of Mrs. DiAngelis, mother of five of the Harley Gang members. She shoots him with machine gun fire, knocking him down. She and the Harleys pitch the alien seaweed.

Later, while on an island of doom created by a rich and crazed stalker of Harley's calling herself Harley Sinn, Captain Strong gives Harley's gang a ride to rescue her. During a battle with mercenaries, it is revealed that he was a former sniper and still has a gun, providing assistance to Harley and her friends by taking out their adversaries, a collection of mercenaries hired by Sinn, from his boat.

References

External links
Action Comics #421 at OddballComics.com
Captain Strong at the Superman Homepage
Superman and Cap'n Strong at the Quarter Bin
Captain Strong at The Unofficial Guide to the DC Universe
Review: Harley Quinn #17 at The Batman Universe site
Review: Harley Quinn #18 at The Batman Universe site
Review: Harley Quinn #19 at The Batman Universe site

DC Comics characters with superhuman strength
DC Comics male characters
Fictional military captains
Fictional sailors
Popeye
Comics characters introduced in 1973